VU University Medical Center Amsterdam ( or VUmc) is the university hospital affiliated with the Vrije Universiteit Amsterdam. It is rated one of the best academic medical centers in the country in terms of patient care and research. It is located next to Amsterdam's A10 ringway in the southwestern part of the city, next to the campus of the Vrije Universiteit and close to Schiphol airport.

On 30 October 2015, researchers at the VUmc Cancer Center Amsterdam reported developing a blood test that, from a single drop of blood, can diagnose cancer with a probability of 97%, and about 6-8% probability of a false diagnosis, in healthy patients. In October 2015 the VUmc got the first MRIdian system in Europe, currently the most advanced radiation therapy system to treat tumors, because the system has a built-in MRI scanner to aim the radiation optimally.

History 
VU University Medical Center Amsterdam was opened in 1964 as the Academic Hospital of the Vrije Universiteit Amsterdam (VU). This was made possible by the Vrouwen VU-hulp ('Women VU Assistance') charity, which was started in 1932 and aimed to support the Vrije Universiteit. Money was collected in the now iconic green tins with the likeness of Abraham Kuyper. These tins were distributed to families of the Reformed Churches in the Netherlands, specifically to the housewives of those families. After the end of the Second World War the charity's goal became to raise money to start a medical school. It took about seven years before sufficient funds were raised, with the government footing 85 percent of the bill.

VU University Medical Center Amsterdam was created in 2001 by the merger of the Academic Hospital of VU with the medical school of VU, nowadays called VUmc School of Medical Sciences. In June 2013 Wouter Bos was appointed as chairman of the board of directors of VU University Medical Center.

Cooperation and merger 
VU University Medical Center Amsterdam is in the process of merging with the other university hospital of Amsterdam, the Academic Medical Center, which is affiliated with the Universiteit van Amsterdam, Amsterdam's other university.

Care 
Tertiary care departments include advanced trauma care, pediatric and neonatal intensive care, cardiothoracic surgery, neurosurgery, infectious diseases and other departments. VUmc has the largest Level I trauma center in the country and an air medical services helicopter is affiliated with the hospital, covering three provinces.

Special units include:

 Neurosurgery
 Cardiothoracic surgery
 Neonatal and pediatric surgery and intensive care
 Pediatric oncology
 Sex reassignment surgery

Research and education 
The VUmc has one of the highest publications in the Netherlands and has a well known reputation worldwide for class leading research. VUmc has several special research units, some of which are:

 VUmc Cancer Center Amsterdam (CCA)
 Neuroscience Campus Amsterdam (NCA)
 EMGO Research Institute
 Institute for Cardiovascular Research (ICaR-VU)

The VUmc also focuses on education and has different departments for their students. These are:

 VUmc School of Medical Sciences (Faculty of Medicine)
 VUmc Academy (coaching for medical students and based on e-learning)
 VUmc Amstel Academy (department for educating Nurses)

Reputation
The medical center installed 35 high-grade security cameras and 35 microphones in the emergency department of the hospital for 16 days in January and February 2012 to film the TV program  (based on the British program 24 Hours in A&E.) After broadcasting the first episode the show was cancelled at the request of the VUmc.

Initially, three patients brought charges against the hospital and the production company for breaking doctor-patient confidentiality, illegal wiretapping and breach of Dutch privacy laws. The charges were settled, and VUmc agreed to pay €30,000.

References

External links

 VU University Medical Center

Buildings and structures in Amsterdam
Hospital buildings completed in 1966
Teaching hospitals in the Netherlands
Medical Center